The Koestler Foundation (originally the KIB) was a British organisation founded in 1980 to promote research in fields that fall outside of established science, specifically parapsychology and alternative medicine. The trustees were Arthur Koestler, Brian Inglis, Tony Bloomfield, Michael Fullerlove, and Sir William Wood. The foundation's original name derived from the initials of Koestler, Inglis and Bloomfield. The name was changed following the suicide death of Arthur Koestler in 1983.

References

Medical and health organisations based in the United Kingdom
Organizations established in 1980
1980 establishments in the United Kingdom